Sylvestre Lopis (born 31 December 1947) is a Senegalese basketball player. He competed in the men's tournament at the 1972 Summer Olympics.

References

1947 births
Living people
Senegalese men's basketball players
Olympic basketball players of Senegal
Basketball players at the 1972 Summer Olympics
Place of birth missing (living people)